is located in the Hidaka Mountains, Hokkaidō, Japan. The mountain has two peaks, the higher being  and the lower being .

References

 Google Maps
 Geographical Survey Institute
 Hokkaipedia

Omushanupuri